Mladen Sarić (16 April 1911 – 19 March 1997) was a Serbian footballer and coach.

Club career  
Sarić played at the youth level in 1928 with SK Soko - Belgrade. In 1931, he played in the Yugoslav Football Championship with FK BASK, and played seven seasons with the club. In 1973, he was named the head coach for the Serbian White Eagles in the National Soccer League.

International career 
Sarić made his debut for the Yugoslavia national football team on 8 May 1938 against Romania.

References  

1911 births
1997 deaths
Footballers from Belgrade
Association football midfielders
Serbian footballers
Serbian football managers
Serbian expatriate football managers
Yugoslav footballers
Yugoslavia international footballers
Yugoslav football managers
FK BASK players
Yugoslav First League players
Serbian White Eagles FC managers
Canadian National Soccer League coaches
Expatriate soccer managers in Canada